Wycliffe is a given name and surname.

John Wycliffe
A most notable holder of the name was John Wycliffe (also spelled Wyclif, Wycliff, Wiclef, Wicliffe, Wickliffe) (c. 1320s – 31 December 1384) who was an English scholastic philosopher, theologian, Biblical translator, reformer, and seminary professor at Oxford. He was an influential dissident within the Roman Catholic priesthood during the 14th century.  Among other things, Wycliffe Hall, Oxford; Wycliffe College, Toronto; Wycliffe College, Gloucestershire; and the 1841 ship John Wickliffe are named after him.

People with the given name
 Wycliffe Gordon (born 1967), American musician
 Wyc Grousbeck, Wycliffe Grousbeck (born 1961), American entrepreneur
 Wyclef Jean (born 1969), Haitian rapper
 Wycliffe Bubba Morton (1931–2006), American baseball player 
 Wycliffe Juma Oluoch (born 1980), Kenyan footballer
 Wycliff Kambonde (born 1988), Namibian footballer
 Wycliffe Ochomo (born 1990), Kenyan footballer
 Wycliffe Oparanya (born 1956), Kenyan politician
 Wycliff Palu (born 1982), Australian rugby player
 Charles Wycliffe Joiner (1916–2017), American judge

People with given names "John Wycliffe"
 John Wycliffe Black (1862–1951), an English shoe manufacturer and politician
 John Wycliffe Lowes Forster (1850–1938), a Canadian artist 
 John Wycliffe Linnell (1878–1967), an English physician

People with the surname
 Elizabeth Wycliffe (born 1983), Canadian swimmer

Other people
 H. Bedford-Jones (1887–1949), a Canadian writer, used the penname John Wycliffe

See also
Wycliffe (disambiguation)
Wickliffe (disambiguation)
Wiglaf
John Wycliffe: The Morning Star, a 1984 film